Jack Skillingstead (born October 24, 1955) is an American science fiction writer living in Seattle, Washington.

In 2001 Skillingstead was named a winner in Stephen King's "On Writing" contest. As of August 2017 he has published forty-two short stories in professional and semi professional markets. He has also published two novels and a story collection. His work has appeared in four Year's Best Anthologies and has been translated into various languages, including Russian, Polish, Czech, Spanish, French, and Chinese. Skillingstead has been nominated for the Philip K. Dick Award and the Theodore Sturgeon Memorial Award. In a review of Are You There and Other Stories, Tangent called Skillingstead "a major author in the genre of SF."

Personal life
Skillingstead was born in 1955 and grew up in a working class suburb of Seattle.  He has spent most of his life in and around that city. Skillingstead is the youngest of five siblings. In 2011 he married science fiction writer Nancy Kress.

Bibliography

Novels
 Harbinger (Fairwood Press, 2009)
 Life On The Preservation (Solaris Books, 2013)
 The Chaos Function (John Joseph Adams Books/Houghton Mifflin Harcourt, 2019)

Short fiction 
Collections
 Are You There and Other Stories (Golden Gryphon Press, 2009)
Stories

 The Apprentice (Whispers From The Shattered Forum, 2003)
 Hardwood (Glyph, 2003)
 Dead Worlds (Asimov's Science Fiction Magazine, 2003)
 Reunion (On Spec, 2004)
 Rewind (Asimov's Science Fiction Magazine, 2004)
 Transplant (Asimov's Science Fiction Magazine, 2004)
 Scatter (Asimov's Science Fiction Magazine, 2004)
 The Tree (On Spec, 2005)
 Bean There (Asimov's Science Fiction Magazine, 2005)
 Overlay (Asimov's Science Fiction Magazine, 2005)
 Are You There (Asimov's Science Fiction Magazine, 2006)
 Life on the Preservation (Asimov's Science Fiction Magazine, 2006)
 Girl in the Empty Apartment (Asimov's Science Fiction Magazine, 2006)
 Two (Talebones Magazine, 2007)
 The Chimera Transit (Asimov's Science Fiction Magazine, 2007)
 Scrawl Daddy (Asimov's Science Fiction Magazine, 2007)
 Thank You, Mr. Whiskers (Asimov's Science Fiction Magazine, 2007)
 Everyone Bleeds Through (Realms of Fantasy, 2007)
 Strangers on a Bus (Asimov's Science Fiction Magazine, 2007)
 What You Are About to See (Asimov's Science Fiction Magazine, 2008)
 Double Occupancy (Polu Texni: A Magazine of Many Arts, 2008)
 Cat in the Rain (Asimov's Science Fiction Magazine, 2008)
 Alone with an Inconvenient Companion (Fast Forward 2, 2008)
 Rescue Mission (The Solaris Book of New Science Fiction: Volume Three, 2009)
 Einstein's Theory (On Spec, 2009)
 Human Day (Asimov's Science Fiction Magazine, 2009)
 The Avenger of Love (Magazine of Fantasy & Science Fiction, 2009)
 Here's Your Space (Are You There and Other Stories, 2009)
 The Flow and Dream (Asimov's Science Fiction Magazine, 2011)
 Free Dog (Asimov's Science Fiction Magazine, 2011)
 Steel Lake (Solaris Rising: The New Solaris Book of Science Fiction, 2011)
 Arlington (Asimov's Science Fiction Magazine, 2013)
 Tribute (Mission: Tomorrow. Baen Books, 2015)
 Salvage opportunity (Clarkesworld Magazine, 2016)
 Licorice (Now We Are Ten. Newcon Press, 2016)
 The Savior Virus (Asimov's Science Fiction Magazine, 2016)
 The Despoilers (Clarkesworld Magazine, 2016)
 The Whole Mess (Asimov's Science Fiction Magazine, 2016)
 Destination (Asimov's Science Fiction Magazine, 2017)
 Mine, Yours, Ours (Chasing Shadows: Visions of Our Coming Transparent World, Tor Books, 2017)
 Assassins / co-written with Burt Courtier (Clarkesworld Magazine, 2017)
 The Last Garden (Lightspeed Magazine, 2017)
 The Sum of Her Expectations (Clarkesworld Magazine, 2017)
 Straconia (Asimov's Science Fiction Magazine, 2018)
 Dream Interpretation (Asimov’s Science Fiction Magazine, 2021)

References

External links
 
 
 

1955 births
Living people
American male novelists
American science fiction writers
Asimov's Science Fiction people
Novelists from Washington (state)
Writers from Seattle